William E. Snyder (September 21, 1901 – March 4, 1984) was an American cinematographer. He was nominated for three Academy Awards in the category Best Cinematography for the films Aloma of the South Seas, The Loves of Carmen and Jolson Sings Again.

Selected filmography 
 Aloma of the South Seas (1941; co-nominated with Wilfred M. Cline and Karl Struss)
 The Loves of Carmen (1947)
 Jolson Sings Again (1948)

References

External links 

1901 births
1984 deaths
People from New York (state)
American cinematographers